Class 444 may refer to:

British Rail Class 444
FS Class E.444